Angie McMahon is an Australian singer-songwriter and musician from Melbourne, Victoria. McMahon released her debut studio album Salt in 2019.

Career

2013-present: Salt

McMahon performed in a nine-piece soul band called The Fabric before beginning her solo career. She won a Telstra competition in 2013 to open for Bon Jovi on the Australian leg of their Because We Can tour. In 2017, McMahon won the Josh Pyke Partnership, releasing her debut single "Slow Mover" in the same year. She has since released the singles, "Missing Me", "Keeping Time", a cover of Neil Young's "Helpless", "Pasta", and "And I am a Woman".

Her debut album, Salt, was released in July 2019 and peaked at #5 on the ARIA Charts. A live extended play was released in September 2019.

In October 2019, Happy Mag labelled her as "one of the most endearing and talented voices in music today," placing her at no. 15 on their list of "The 15 Australian female artists changing the game right now." On 3 October 2019, McMahon released a cover of Tom Waits' "Take It With Me"; the lead single from an all-female tribute album to the singer titled Come On Up to the House: Women Sing Waits. In November 2019, McMahon released a cover of the Fleetwood Mac song, "Silver Springs"; a song McMahon names as her favourite. In February 2020, McMahon released a cover version of ABBA's "Knowing Me, Knowing You" as part of Triple J's Like a Version.

Discography

Albums

Extended plays

Singles

As lead artist

As featured artist

Guest appearances

Awards

AIR Awards
The Australian Independent Record Awards (commonly known informally as AIR Awards) is an annual awards night to recognise, promote and celebrate the success of Australia's Independent Music sector.

|-
| AIR Awards of 2018
| "Slow Mover"
| Breakthrough Independent Artist
| 
|-
| rowspan="2"| AIR Awards of 2020
| herself
| Breakthrough Independent Artist
| 
|-
| Salt
| Best Independent Rock Album or EP
| 
|-

APRA Awards
The APRA Awards are presented annually from 1982 by the Australasian Performing Right Association (APRA), "honouring composers and songwriters". They commenced in 1982.

! 
|-
| rowspan="2"| 2019
| rowspan="2"| "Slow Mover"
| Rock Work of the Year
| 
| rowspan="2"| 
|-
| Song of the Year
| 
|-
| 2020 
| "Pasta"
| Song of the Year
| 
| 
|-

ARIA Music Awards
The ARIA Music Awards is an annual awards ceremony that recognises excellence, innovation, and achievement across all genres of Australian music. Angie McMahon has been nominated for one award.

|-
| 2019
| Salt
| Best Independent Release
| 
|-

J Award
The J Awards are an annual series of Australian music awards that were established by the Australian Broadcasting Corporation's youth-focused radio station Triple J. They commenced in 2005.

|-
| J Awards of 2018
| herself
| Unearthed Artist of the Year
|

Music Victoria Awards
The Music Victoria Awards are an annual awards night celebrating Victorian music. They commenced in 2006.

|-
| rowspan="2"| Music Victoria Awards of 2018
| Angie McMahon
| Best Solo Artist
| 
|-
| Angie McMahon
| Breakthrough Act
| 
|-
| rowspan="3"| Music Victoria Awards of 2019
| Salt
| Best Album
| 
|-
| Angie McMahon
| Best Female Musician
| 
|-
| Angie McMahon
| Best Solo Artist
| 
|-
| Music Victoria Awards of 2020
| Angie McMahon
| Best Solo Artist
|

National Live Music Awards
The National Live Music Awards (NLMAs) are a broad recognition of Australia's diverse live industry, celebrating the success of the Australian live scene. The awards commenced in 2016.

|-
| National Live Music Awards of 2019
| Angie McMahon
| Live Indie / Rock Act of the Year
| 
|-

References

21st-century Australian musicians
Living people
Year of birth missing (living people)
People from Alphington, Victoria
Musicians from Melbourne
Australian singer-songwriters